Midland Cemetery is a metropolitan cemetery in the suburb of Swan view in Perth, Western Australia.  In earlier times it was known as the  Midland Junction Cemetery due to its control by the local council of that name.

It is currently administered by the Metropolitan Cemeteries Board.  Previously it had been administered by the local government.

People interred at Midland Cemetery include Albert Facey.

Burial lists up to 1998 are available from the Cemeteries Board and are viewable at Battye Library.

War graves
There are two war graves at the cemetery of Australian soldiers of World War I.

See also
 Burials at Karrakatta Cemetery
 East Perth Cemeteries
 Guildford cemetery

References

External links

 
 Midland Cemetery – Billion Graves

Cemeteries in Western Australia
Midland, Western Australia